1736 Floirac, provisional designation , is a stony Florian asteroid from the inner regions of the asteroid belt, approximately 8.7 kilometer in diameter.

It was discovered on 6 September 1967, by French astronomer Guy Soulié at Bordeaux Observatory in southwestern France, who named it after the French town of Floirac.

Classification and orbit 

Floirac is a member of the Flora family. It orbits the Sun at a distance of 1.9–2.6 AU once every 3 years and 4 months (1,215 days). Its orbit has an eccentricity of 0.17 and an inclination of 5° with respect to the ecliptic.

Physical characteristics 

This asteroid has been characterized as a stony S-type asteroid by PanSTARRS photometric survey.

Lightcurves 

In October 2007, a rotational lightcurve of Floirac was obtained from photometric observations by astronomer Petr Pravec and collaborating colleges. Lightcurve analysis gave a rotation period of 6.775 hours with a low brightness variation of 0.08 magnitude. An alternative period solution of 12.28 hours (Δmag 0.25) was found by French amateur astronomer Laurent Bernasconi in June 2006.

Diameter and albedo 

According to the surveys carried out by the Japanese Akari satellite and NASA's Wide-field Infrared Survey Explorer with its subsequent NEOWISE mission, Floirac measures between 8.617 and 10.08 kilometers in diameter and its surface has an albedo of 0.252 and 0.302.

The Collaborative Asteroid Lightcurve Link takes an albedo of 0.2711 and a diameter of 8.73 kilometers with an absolute magnitude of 12.4, based on Petr Pravec's revised WISE-data.

Naming 

This minor planet was named by the discoverer for Floirac, a French town in the Département Gironde, near Bordeaux, where the discovering observatory is located. The official  was published by the Minor Planet Center on 15 July 1968.

Notes

References

External links 
 Asteroid Lightcurve Database (LCDB), query form (info )
 Dictionary of Minor Planet Names, Google books
 Asteroids and comets rotation curves, CdR – Observatoire de Genève, Raoul Behrend
 Discovery Circumstances: Numbered Minor Planets (1)-(5000) – Minor Planet Center
 
 

001736
Discoveries by Guy Soulié
Named minor planets
19670906